"Lord, I Hope This Day is Good" is a song written by Dave Hanner, and recorded by American country music artist Don Williams.  It was released in November 1981 as the third single from the album  Especially for You.  The song was Williams' twelfth number one on the country chart.  The single stayed at number one for one week and spent a total of twenty weeks on the country music charts. Hanner also recorded the song as a member of Corbin/Hanner, who released it as the b-side to the 1982 single "One Fine Morning."

Cover versions
Anne Murray recorded a version of the song on her 1999 inspirational album.
Lee Ann Womack also recorded a version of the song on her 2000 album I Hope You Dance.
Keb' Mo' covered the song of the Williams tribute album Gentle Giants: The Songs of Don Williams.
 Paul Brewster recorded a cover on his album Everybody's Talkin.
 Brandon Rhyder recorded a cover on his album Live at Billy Bob's Texas'.
 Jr Williams recorded a cover on a single released by Mountain Fever Records in April, 2022.

Charts

Weekly charts

Year-end charts

References

1981 singles
1981 songs
Don Williams songs
Anne Murray songs
Lee Ann Womack songs
Song recordings produced by Garth Fundis
MCA Records singles